The following lists events that happened during 1952 in the Grand Duchy of Luxembourg.

Incumbents

Events

January – March

April – June
 2 May – Hubert Clement is appointed to the Council of State.
 27 May – Luxembourg is one of six signatories of the Treaty of Paris, which was to create the European Defence Community.
 12 June – A law is reforming the organisation of the Luxembourg Army is passed.

July – September
 23 July – The foreign ministers of the six European Coal and Steel Community meet in Paris to decide on the seat of the organisation's headquarters.  At Joseph Bech's proposal, Luxembourg City is chosen as the provisional working seat.
 26 July – At the 1952 Summer Olympics, Josy Barthel wins the men's 1,500m in a new Olympic record time: to date, the only time an athlete has won a gold medal for Luxembourg at the Olympics.
 10 August – The High Authority of the European Coal and Steel Community holds its first meeting, at Luxembourg City Hall.

October – December

Births
 6 February – Charles Goerens, politician
 29 March – Lucien Faber, athlete
 12 April – Marie-Josée Frank, politician
 27 June – Mars Di Bartolomeo, politician
 9 July – François Diederich, chemist
 18 July – Christine Doerner, politician
 9 August – Jean-Louis Margue, footballer
 22 November – Lydie Polfer, politician

Deaths
 25 March – Léon Kauffman, politician and Prime Minister

Footnotes

References